Periclimenes colemani is a species of saltwater shrimp found in the Indo-Pacific Ocean that was first described in 1975 by Alexander James Bruce.

It is found in association with the sea urchin Asthenosoma intermedium at depths to 12 m on coral reefs in the littoral and sub-littoral zones.

References

External links
Periclimenes colemani images & occurrence data from GBIF
 

Palaemonidae
Crustaceans of the Indian Ocean
Crustaceans of the Pacific Ocean
Crustaceans described in 1975